Marathon Watch Company Ltd. is a Canadian watch manufacturer founded in 1939.
Its predecessor company, Weinstrum Watch, later to be named Wein Brothers, was founded in 1904.
Marathon started supplying watches to the Allies of World War II in 1941.
Today Marathon manufactures watches that conform to United States Military Standard MIL-PRF-46374G, as well as those of other nations.
Marathon is the sole supplier of watches to the United States Armed Forces.

Marathon watches are issued to US military personnel, but are also available to the general public.

Marathon watches are designed in Canada and manufactured in Switzerland by Gallet & Co., and therefore watches bear the designation "Swiss Made" on the dial.

References

External links
 Marathon Watch website
 Windy City Watch Collector Authorized Retailer website

Manufacturing companies of Canada
Watch manufacturing companies
Canadian companies established in 1939